HMS Star was a Palmer three-funnel, 30-knot destroyer ordered by the Royal Navy under the 1896–1897 Naval Estimates. She was the eleventh ship to carry this name since it was introduced in 1643 for a 19-gun ship sold until 1652.

Construction

Three funnels were fitted, and 91 tons of coal carried.

Armament was specified as a single QF 12-pounder 12 cwt gun on a platform on the ship's conning tower (in practice the platform was also used as the ship's bridge), backed up by five 6-pounder guns, and two 18-inch (450 mm) torpedo tubes.

Star was laid down on 23 March 1896, at the Palmer's Jarrow-on-Tyne shipyard as Yard Number 710, and launched on 11 August 1896.  During her builder’s trials she made her contracted speed requirement, reaching .  She was completed and accepted by the Royal Navy in September 1898.

Service history

Pre-War
She was commissioned at Portsmouth on 27 August 1901 by Lieutenant Henry Willcox Osburn and assigned to the Portsmouth Flotilla of the Channel Fleet. The following year, Lieutenant James W. G. Innes was appointed in command from 1 March 1902, but the appointment was cancelled almost immediately when he received another posting. Star was subsequently used for experiments to test the rolling tendency of destroyers with a bilge keel.

She spent her operational career mainly in Home Waters, although she did visit Gibraltar in 1905. In 1910, Star was a member of the 4th Destroyer Flotilla, based at Portsmouth, and was still a member of the 4th Flotilla in 1912, while in 1913 she was a member of the 6th Destroyer Flotilla, a local patrol flotilla also based at Portsmouth.

On 30 August 1912 the Admiralty directed all destroyers were to be grouped into classes designated by letters based on contract speed and appearance. The class letters were painted on the hull below the bridge area and on a funnel.

World War I
For the test mobilization in July 1914 she was assigned to the 8th Destroyer Flotilla based at Chatham.  Here Star provided local anti-submarine and counter-mining patrols.

In November 1916 she was redeployed to the 7th Destroyer Flotilla based at the Humber River. During her deployment there she was involved in anti-submarine and counter-mining patrols.

On 4 July 1918, the Norwegian barque Mentor was torpedoed by the German submarine  near Hartlepool. Star and  took part in the rescue of Mentor, which was towed to port, although too heavily damaged to be repaired. On 29 September 1918, the airship R29 spotted an oil slick, presumed to be from a German submarine, while escorting a convoy, and directed Star,  and two armed trawlers to the site of the slick. The ships then proceeded to depth charge the submarine, . UB-115 sank  North East from Beacon Point, Newton-by-the-Sea, with the loss of 39 officers and men.

In 1919 Star was paid off and laid-up in reserve awaiting disposal.  The destroyer was sold on 23 July 1919 to Thos. W. Ward of Sheffield for breaking at New Holland, Lincolnshire, on the Humber Estuary.

Pennant numbers

Notes

References
 
 
 
 
 
 
 
 
 
 
 
 

 

Ships built on the River Tyne
1896 ships
C-class destroyers (1913)
World War I destroyers of the United Kingdom